Natanya Beth Ross (born October 4, 1981, in Asbury Park, New Jersey) is an American actress who is most famous for playing Robyn Russo, a regular character in The Secret World of Alex Mack.

Ross first got her start in TV by doing a commercial for McDonald's. She later starred in the 1995 television version of Freaky Friday and the movie The Baby-Sitters Club. Natanya also played the character Kelly in the 1999 movie Bellyfruit. She was last seen in a 2000 episode of Boston Public.

Filmography

References

External links

1981 births
Actresses from California
American child actresses
American television actresses
Living people
21st-century American women